Sarana, Pella is a town in the Pella Department of Boulkiemdé Province in central western Burkina Faso. It has a population of 1,774.

References

External links
Satellite map at Maplandia.com

Populated places in Boulkiemdé Province